Obedience may refer to:

 Obedience (human behavior)
 Obedience, an educational film about the Milgram experiment on obedience to authority figures
 Obedience, a common name for the plant Maranta arundinacea
 Obedience, a common name for the plant Physostegia virginiana
 Obedience (album), an EP by Swedish black metal band Marduk, released in 2000

See also

 Vow of obedience as an evangelical counsel
 Obedience training for dogs
 Obedience trial, a dog sport